Mexico–Panama relations are the diplomatic relations between Mexico and Panama. Both nations are mutual members of the Association of Caribbean States, Community of Latin American and Caribbean States, Latin American Integration Association, Organization of Ibero-American States and the Organization of American States.

History 

Mexico and Panama share a common history in the fact that both nations were colonized by the Spanish empire. In 1821, both nations obtained independence from Spain and Panama became part of the Gran Colombia. In 1831, the Gran Colombia dissolved into three separate nations (Colombia, Ecuador and Venezuela) with Panama remaining part of Colombia. In 1856, Mexico opened a consular office in Panama City which was under the administration of the Mexican Legation in Bogotá. In 1899, Colombia and Panama were involved in an internal political war known as the Thousand Days' War which lasted until 1902. The United States took advantage of the war to build a canal in Panama and when Colombia refused to ratify the Hay–Herrán Treaty; the United States sponsored a rebellion for the separation of Panama from Colombia. On 3 November 1903; Panama became an independent nation. Mexico and Panama established diplomatic relations on 1 March 1904.

During the 1970s, Mexico became a vocal supporter for dialogue between Panama and the United States for eventual Panamanian control of the Panama Canal. In 1977, Panama and the United States signed the Torrijos–Carter Treaties giving Panama eventual control of the canal in December 1999. During the 1980s, foreign ministers of Colombia, Mexico, Panama and Venezuela created the Contadora Group in order to diplomatically try to resolve the crisis facing many Central American nations at the time.

In 1989, Mexico and Panama withdrew their respective ambassadors after the accusations from the United States and international community that the former Panamanian President Manuel Noriega was involved in money laundering and was not democratically elected. In December 1989, the United States invaded Panama and removed Noriega from power. In September 1992, Mexico and Panama re-established full diplomatic relations.

Today, bilateral relations between Mexico and Panama are continuously active and strong. There have been numerous high-level presidential visits between leaders of both nations over the years. In March 2019, both nations celebrated 115 years of diplomatic relations.

High-level visits

Presidential visits from Mexico to Panama

 President Adolfo Ruiz Cortines (1956)
 President Gustavo Díaz Ordaz (1966)
 President José López Portillo (1978)
 President Miguel de la Madrid (1984)
 President Carlos Salinas de Gortari (1994)
 President Ernesto Zedillo (1996, 1998, 1999)
 President Vicente Fox (2001, 2004, 2005, 2006)
 President Felipe Calderón (2008, January & June 2009)
 President Enrique Peña Nieto (2013, 2015)

Presidential visits from Panama to Mexico

 President Omar Torrijos (1969, 1975)
 President Demetrio B. Lakas (1971)
 President Aristides Royo (1981)
 President Ricardo de la Espriella (1982)
 President Nicolás Ardito Barletta Vallarino (1985)
 President Eric Arturo Delvalle (1987)
 President Guillermo Endara (1991, 1992)
 President Ernesto Pérez Balladares (1994, 1997)
 President Mireya Moscoso (2000, 2001, 2002, 2004)
 President Martín Torrijos (2006, 2007)
 President Ricardo Martinelli (2014)
 President Juan Carlos Varela (2014, 2015, 2016)
 President Laurentino Cortizo (2019)

Bilateral agreements
Both nations have signed several bilateral agreements such as an Agreement on Consular Assistance; Treaty on the Execution of Criminal Judgments; Agreement on Cooperation to Combat Drug Trafficking and Drug dependency; Agreement on Air Transportation; Agreement on Technical and Scientific Cooperation; Treaty on Mutual Legal Assistance in Criminal Matters; Agreement on Educational and Cultural Cooperation; Agreement on Touristic Cooperation; Agreement for Mutual Cooperation in the Exchange of Information regarding Financial Transactions carried out through Financial Institutions to Prevent, Detect and Combat Operations of Illegal Origin or Money Laundering; Extradition Treaty and an Agreement to Avoid Double Taxation and Prevent Tax Evasion in Tax on Income.

Transportation
There are direct flights between both nations with Aeroméxico and Copa Airlines.

Trade relations 

In April 2014, both nations signed a free trade agreement. In 2018, two-way trade between both nations amounted to US$1.1 billion. Mexico's main exports to Panama include: fuel oil; pharmaceutical products; flat screen televisions; automobiles and tractors; paper; machinery; and electronics. Panama's main exports to Mexico include: fuel; gas; pharmaceuticals; and essential oils for the perfume industry.

Mexico is Panama's third biggest trading partner in Central America. Mexico is also the eighth largest user of the Panama Canal. Between 1999 and 2017, Panama invested over US$363 million. Several Mexican multinational companies such as América Móvil, Cemex, Grupo Bimbo and Gruma (among others) operate in Panama.

Resident diplomatic missions 
 Mexico has an embassy in Panama City.
 Panama has an embassy in Mexico City and a consulate-general in Veracruz.

References 
 Mexican Ministry of Foreign Affairs on bilateral relations between Mexico and Panama (in Spanish)

 
Panama
Bilateral relations of Panama